The 2004 FIFA World Player of the Year award was won by Brazilian Ronaldinho for the first time, Thierry Henry finished second for the second year in succession.

Results

Men

Women

FIFA World Player of the Year
FIFA World Player of the Year winners